The Avengers is a team of comic book superheroes in the Marvel Comics universe. Since 1963, they have starred in several ongoing series, as well as a large number of limited series and specials. All stories are published exclusively by Marvel Comics under their standard imprint, unless otherwise noted.

Primary series
 Avengers #1-402 (September 1963 – September 1996)
 Avengers Annual #1-23 (1967–1969, 1971–1972, 1976–1979, 1981–1994)
 Giant-Size Avengers #1-5 (August 1974 – December 1975)
 Avengers vol. 2, #1-13 [#403-415] (Marvel Comics/Extreme Studios/Wildstorm; November 1996 – November 1997)
 Avengers vol. 3, #1-84 [#416-499]; #500-503 (February 1998 – December 2004)
 Avengers #0 (Marvel Comics/Wizard Entertainment; July 1999)
 Avengers/Squadron Supreme Annual '98 (1998)
 Avengers Annual '99 (1999)
 Avengers Annual 2000 (2000)
 Avengers Annual 2001 (2001)
 Avengers Finale #1 (January 2005)
 New Avengers #1-64 [#504-567] (January 2005 – April 2010)
 New Avengers Annual #1-3 (2006–2009)
 New Avengers Finale (2010)
 Avengers vol. 4, #1-34 [#568-601] (May 2010 – November 2012)
 Avengers Annual #1 (2012)
 Avengers vol. 5, #1-44 [#602-645] (December 2012 – June 2015)
 Avengers Annual #1 (2013)
 Avengers Vol 6, #0 (2015)
 All-New All-Different Avengers #1-15 [#646-660] (October 2015 – September 2016)
 All-New All-Different Avengers Annual #1 (2016)
 Avengers vol. 7, #1-11 [#661-671]; #672-#690 (November 2016 - April 2018)
 Avengers vol. 8, #1-66 [Leg #691-766 (May 2nd 2018 - present)
 Avengers Annual #1 (2021)
 Avengers Forever vol.2 #1-15 (2022-2023
 Avengers vol. 9, #1-present [Legacy 767-present] (May 2023-present

Spin-off series
 West Coast Avengers #1-4 (September–December 1984)
 West Coast Avengers vol. 2, #1-46 (October 1985 – July 1989)
 West Coast Avengers Annual #1-3 (1986–1988)
 Avengers West Coast #47-102 (August 1989 – January 1994)
 Avengers West Coast Annual #4-8 (1989–1993)
 West Coast Avengers  vol. 3, #1-10 (August 2018 - April 2019)
 Solo Avengers #1-20 (December 1987 – July 1989)
 Avengers Spotlight #21-40 (August 1989 – January 1991)
 Force Works #1-22 (July 1994 – April 1996)
 Avengers Unplugged #1-6 (October 1995 – August 1996)
 The Avengers: United They Stand #1-7 (November 1999 – June 2000)
 Young Avengers #1-12 (April 2005 – January 2007)
 Young Avengers Special #1 (February 2006)
 Young Avengers vol. 2 #1-15 (January 2013 - January 2014)
 Marvel Adventures: The Avengers #1-39 (July 2006 – August 2009)
 Avengers: The Initiative #1-35 (April 2007 – June 2010)
 Avengers: The Initiative Annual #1 (January 2008)
 Avengers: The Initiative Special #1 (January 2009)
 Mighty Avengers #1-36 (May 2007 – April 2010)
 Mighty Avengers vol. 2 #1-14 (November 2013 - November 2014)
 Captain America and the Mighty Avengers #1-9 (January - August 2015)
 Dark Avengers #1-16 (January 2009 – April 2010)
 Dark Avengers #175-190 (June 2012 - May 2013)
 Secret Avengers #1-37 (May 2010 – January 2013)
 Secret Avengers vol. 2 #1-16 (February 2013 – February 2014)
 Secret Avengers vol. 3 #1-15 (March 2014 - June 2015)
 Avengers Academy #1-40 (June 2010 – November 2012)
 Avengers Academy Giant Size #1 (July 2011)
 New Avengers vol. 2, #1-34 (June 2010 – November 2012)
 New Avengers Annual #1 (2011)
 New Avengers vol. 3, #1-33 (January 2013 – June 2015)
 New Avengers Annual #1 (2014)
 New Avengers vol. 4, #1-18 (October 2015 – November 2016)
 Avengers Assemble #1-25 (March 2012 – March 2014)
 Uncanny Avengers #1-25 (October 2012 – December 2014)
 Uncanny Avengers Annual #1 (April 2014)
 Uncanny Avengers vol. 2 #1-5 (March 2015 - August 2015)
 Uncanny Avengers vol. 3 #1-30 (October 2015 – January 2018)
 Uncanny Avengers Annual #1 (January 2016)
 A+X #1-18 (October 2012 – March 2014)
 Avengers Arena #1-18 (December 2012 – November 2013)
 Avengers A.I. #1-12 (July 2013 - June 2014)
 Avengers World #1-21 (January 2014 - July 2015)
 Avengers Undercover #1-10 (March 2014 - November 2014)
 A-Force #1-5 (May 2015 - October 2015)
 A-Force vol. 2 #1-10 (January 2016 – October 2016)
 Ultimates Vol. 2 (January 2016 - December 2016)
 Ultimates 2 Vol. 2 (January 2017 - August 2017)
 Occupy Avengers #1-9 (November 2016 – September 2017)
 Great Lakes Avengers Vol. 2 #1-7 (December 2016 - June 2017)
 U.S.Avengers #1-12 (March 2017 - January 2018)
 Savage Avengers #1-28 (May 2019 - January 2022)
 Avengers Forever #1-present (December 2021 -present)

Limited series and specials
Specials and limited series which are part of an ongoing story in the primary series, or became ongoing series, are included above.

Limited series
 X-Men vs. the Avengers #1-4 (April–July 1987)
 Avengers: The Terminatrix Objective #1-4 (September–December 1993)
 The Last Avengers Story #1-2 (November–December 1995)
 Domination Factor: Avengers #1.2, 2.4, 3.6, 4.8 (November 1999 – February 2000)
 Domination Factor: Fantastic Four #1.1, 2.3, 3.5, 4.7
 Avengers Forever #1-12 (December 1998 – February 2000)
 Avengers Two: Wonder Man and Beast #1-3 (May–July 2000)
 Avengers Infinity #1-4 (September–December 2000)
 Avengers: Celestial Quest #1-8 (November 2001 – June 2002)
 Avengers Icons: Tigra #1-4 (May–August 2002)
 Avengers Icons: The Vision #1-4 (October 2002 – January 2003)
 JLA/Avengers #1, 3 (Marvel Comics/DC Comics; September 2003, December 2003)
 Avengers/JLA #2, 4 (DC Comics/Marvel Comics; October 2003, March 2004)
 Avengers/Thunderbolts #1-6 (May–September 2004)
 Avengers: Earth's Mightiest Heroes #1-8 (November 2004 – March 2005)
 Avengers: Earth's Mightiest Heroes II #1-8 (January–May 2007)
 Avengers and Power Pack Assemble! #1-4 (June–September 2006)
 New Avengers: Illuminati vol. 2, #1-5 (February 2007 – January 2008)
 New Avengers/Transformers #1-4 (Marvel Comics/IDW Publishing; July–October 2007)
 Avengers/Invaders #1-12 (July 2008 – August 2009)
 New Avengers: The Reunion #1-4 (May–August 2009)
 Lockjaw and the Pet Avengers #1-4 (July–October 2009)
 Lockjaw and the Pet Avengers: Unleashed #1-4 (May–August 2010)
 Avengers vs. Pet Avengers #1-4 (December 2010 – March 2011)
 New Avengers: Luke Cage #1-3 (April–June 2010)
 I Am an Avenger #1-5 (May 2010 – March 2011)
 Avengers: The Origin #1-5 (June–October 2010)
 Avengers Prime #1-5 (August 2010 – March 2011)
 Avengers: The Children's Crusade #1-9 (September 2010 – March 2012)
 Chaos War: Dead Avengers #1-3 (January–March 2011)
 Avengers 1959 #1-5 (December 2011 – March 2012)
 Avengers: X-Sanction #1-4 (February–May 2012)
 Avengers vs. X-Men #0-12 (May–December 2012)
 Avengers & X-Men: AXIS #1-9 (December 2014 - February 2015)
 Avengers Millennium #1-4 (June 2015)

One-shots and original graphic novels
 Avengers: Emperor Doom (1987, Marvel Graphic Novel #27)
 Avengers: Deathtrap - The Vault (1991)
 Avengers Collector's Edition (1993). Presented by Sugar Daddy, Sugar Babies, and Charleston Chew.
 Avengers Strikefile (January 1994)
 Avengers Log (February 1994)
 Avengers: The Crossing #1 (September 1995)
 Hot Shots: Avengers (October 1995)
 Ultraforce/Avengers Prelude (Ultraverse/Marvel Comics; August 1995)
 Ultraforce/Avengers #1 (Ultraverse/Marvel Comics; August 1995)
 Avengers/Ultraforce #1 (Marvel Comics/Ultraverse; October 1995)
 Avengers: Timeslide #1 (February 1996)
 Avengers: Rough Cut #1 (August 1998)
 Timeslip Special: The Coming of the Avengers (October 1998)
 Avengers #1½ (December 1999)
 Avengers Casebook #1 (February 2000)
 Avengers: The Ultron Imperitave #1 (November 2001)
 What If Jessica Jones Had Joined the Avengers? (December 2004)
 The Official Handbook of the Marvel Universe: Avengers 2004 (2004)
 The Official Handbook of the Marvel Universe: Avengers 2005 (2005)
 New Avengers: Illuminati #1 (2006)
 New Avengers: Most Wanted Files (2006)
 Giant-Size Avengers vol. 2, #1 (February 2008)
 Avengers Assemble #1 (July 2010)
 Avengers Origins: Ant-Man & The Wasp #1 (January 2012)
 Avengers Origins: Luke Cage #1 (January 2012)
 Avengers Origins: Scarlet Witch & Quicksilver #1 (January 2012)
 Avengers Origins: Thor #1 (January 2012)
 Avengers Origins: Vision #1 (January 2012)
 Avengers: Endless Wartime (2013)
 Avengers: Rage of Ultron (2015)
 Avengers vs. #1 (July 2015)
 Avengers: Ultron Forever (Part 1) #1 (2015)
 New Avengers: Ultron Forever (Part 2) #1 (2015)
 Uncanny Avengers: Ultron Forever (Part 3) #1 (2015)
 Avengers: Operation Hydra #1 (June 2015)
 Avengers Free Comic Book Day #1 (June 2015)
 Avengers: It All Begins Here #0 (December 2015)
 Avengers vs. Infinity #1 (January 2016)
 Avengers Standoff Welcome to Pleasant Hill #1 (April 2016)
 Avengers Standoff Assault on Pleasant Hill Alpha #1 (May 2016)
 Avengers Standoff Assault on Pleasant Hill Omega #1 (June 2016)

Reprint series
 Marvel Triple Action #5-47 (September 1972 – April 1979)
 Marvel Super Action #14-37 (December 1979 – November 1981)
 Kree/Skrull War Starring the Avengers #1-2 (September–October 1983)
 Avengers Universe #1-6 (July 2000 – February 2001)
 Avengers United #1-100 (June 2001 – December 2008)
 Avengers Classic #1-12 (June 2007 – April 2008)
 Avengers Unconquered #1-current (January 2009 – present)

Collected editions
All collections are in standard-size, colour, trade paperback format unless otherwise stated.

Essential Avengers

Marvel Masterworks: Avengers (hardcover)

The Avengers Epic Collection

The Avengers

All-New, All-Different Avengers
After the "Secret Wars" (2015) crossover story line, The Avengers relaunched as All-New, All-Different Avengers in October 2015.

Oversize hardback collections

New Avengers
After the "Disassembled" crossover story line, The Avengers relaunched as New Avengers in January 2005.

Mighty Avengers
After the "Civil War" crossover story arc, the official Avengers were relaunched by Iron Man as the Mighty Avengers, with their own series, while the New Avengers went underground, continuing their own individual series.

Avengers: The Initiative
The Avengers: The Initiative story run began after the "Civil War" crossover story arc, with the story based around the 50 State Initiative, set up as part of the Superhuman Registration Act.

Secret Avengers
Secret Avengers has been collected in the following hardcovers:

Solo Avengers

Uncanny Avengers
Uncanny Avengers has been collected in the following hardcovers:

West Coast Avengers

Indices
 Official Marvel Index to the Avengers #1-8 (August 1987 – October 1988)
 Official Marvel Index to the Avengers'' #1-6 (October 1994 – March 1995)

References

 
Lists of comic book titles
 
Lists of comics by team
Lists of comics by Marvel Comics